Dark Element, The Dark Element or Dark Elements may refer to:

 The Dark Element, a Finnish–Swedish musical group
 The Dark Element (album), a 2017 album by The Dark Element
 Dark Elements, a book series by Jennifer Armentrout
 Dark Element, a character in the video game Dark Chronicle